Boutheia or Bouthia (Βουθία) was a town of ancient Ionia, near Erythrae. It was a member of the Delian League since it is mentioned in tributary records of Athens at least between the years 454/3 and 427/6 or 426/5 BCE. In some of these records it appears as part of the territory of Erythrae.

Its site is located near the modern Çeşme, İzmir Province, Turkey.

References

Populated places in ancient Ionia
Former populated places in Turkey
Greek city-states
Members of the Delian League
History of İzmir Province